Roper is an English surname. In England, people with this surname include members from the House of Roper. Members of the family have held three hereditary titles: Viscount of Baltinglass, Baron Dacre of Glanton, and Baron of Teynham.

Other people worldwide, with the surname include politicians, academics, sportsmen, entertainment, and fictional characters.

House of Roper
William Roper (1496–1578), attorney general of Henry VIII, was offered a Dukedom by him, but declined it.
Margaret Roper (1505–1544), English, writer, and daughter to Thomas More
John Roper, 1st Baron Teynham (c. 1534–1618)
Christopher Roper, 2nd Baron Teynham (1561–1622)
Sir Thomas Roper, 1st Viscount Baltinglass (1587-1638)
Elizabeth Roper (d. 1658), English courtier
John Roper, 3rd Baron Teynham (c. 1591–1628)
Thomas Roper, 2nd Viscount Baltinglass (died )
Cary Roper, 3rd Viscount Baltinglass (died 1672)
Christopher Roper, 4th Baron Teynham (1621–1673)
Christopher Roper, 5th Baron Teynham (d. 1689)
John Roper, 6th Baron Teynham (d. 1697)
Christopher Roper, 7th Baron Teynham (d. 1699)
Henry Roper, 8th Baron Teynham (c. 1676–1723)
Philip Roper, 9th Baron Teynham (1707–1727)
Henry Roper, 10th Baron Teynham (c. 1708–1781)
Henry Roper, 11th Baron Teynham (1734–1786)
Henry Roper, 12th Baron Teynham (1764–1800)
John Roper, 13th Baron Teynham (1767–1824)
Henry Francis Roper-Curzon, 14th Baron Teynham (1767–1842)
Henry Roper-Curzon, 15th Baron Teynham (1789–1842)
George Henry Roper-Curzon, 16th Baron Teynham (1798–1889)
Henry George Roper-Curzon, 17th Baron Teynham (1822–1892)
Henry John Philip Sidney Roper-Curzon, 18th Baron Teynham (1867–1936)
Christopher John Henry Roper-Curzon, 19th Baron Teynham (1896–1972)
Hugh Trevor-Roper (1914–2003), Baron Dacre of Glanton
John Christopher Ingham Roper-Curzon, 20th Baron Teynham (1928–2021)
David John Henry Ingham Roper-Curzon, 21st Baron Teynham (born 1965)

The heir apparent is the present holder's son Henry "Harry" Christopher John Ingham Roper-Curzon (born 1986).

Politicians
Daniel Calhoun Roper (1867–1943), an American politician
Elmer Roper (1893–1994), a Canadian politician
Sandra Roper (born 1956), a New York lawyer and politician
John Roper, Baron Roper (1935–2016), a British politician

Academics and writers
Brian Roper (academic), former vice-chancellor of London Met
Clyde Roper (born 1937), zoologist known for his research on giant squid
L. David Roper (born 1935), discoverer of the Roper resonance in particle physics and genealogist
Lyndal Roper, Fellow at Oriel College and author of Witch Craze
Nancy Roper (1918–2004), British nurse theorist and lexicographer

Sportspeople
Tony Roper (racing driver) (1964–2000), pickup race driver.
Jim Roper (1916-2000), race driver
Brian Roper (Gaelic footballer), an Irish Gaelic footballer who plays for Donegal
Don Roper (1922–2001), an English footballer
John Roper, Major League Baseball pitcher for the Cincinnati Reds
Justin Roper (born 1987), American football player
Steve Roper, an American rock climber

Entertainers
Brian Roper (actor) (1929–1994), British and American film actor noted for his character portrayal as Dickon in The Secret Garden (1949 film).
David Roper, British actor
Deidra Muriel Roper (born 1948), an American DJ and singer.
George Roper, British stand-up comedian. Known for his work on the British comedy show The Comedians.
Lizzie Roper (born 1968), British actress
Reese Roper, singer / songwriter for the bands Five Iron Frenzy, Brave Saint Saturn, and Roper
Todd Roper, drummer for the band Deathray
Skid Roper, an American musician
Jake Roper, host of YouTube science show Vsauce 3.

Other people
Col. Roper (died 1788), Commander in Chief of the Island of St. Vincent, killed in a duel with Mr. Thomas Purefoy.
Abel Roper (1665–1726), English journalist and publisher
Moses Roper (c. 1810 – c. 1861), a slave born in North Carolina who escaped to England and wrote a book about his slavery experiences
Elmo Roper (1900–1971), founder of the Roper Opinion Research Company (the "Roper Poll"), later renamed Roper Starch Worldwide Company
George Denny Roper (1855–1925), founder of the Roper Manufacturing Company of Zanesville, Ohio, later purchased by Whirlpool Corporation
Harry J. Roper, current partner and Chair - Intellectual Property, Jenner & Block
Jesse M. Roper (1851–1901), an officer of the United States Navy
Joanna Roper (born 1969), British civil servant and diplomat
John Charles Abercromby Roper, (1915–1998), British foreign-service officer
Lanning Roper (1912–1983), a United States citizen who became a well-known English gardener
John Roper (born c. 1822, date of death unknown), Australian explorer; Roper Peak and Roper River in the Northern Territory are named after him
Kevin Roper, animator for Hanna-Barbera Productions in the 1970s
Patrick Trevor-Roper (1916–2004), a British surgeon and gay rights activist
Sylvester Howard Roper (1823–1896), Inventor of the motorcycle
Shirley Phelps-Roper (born 1957), de facto spokesman for the Topeka, Kansas-based Westboro Baptist Church, daughter of Fred Phelps

Fictional characters
 George Roper, fictional character in the British sitcom George and Mildred.
Stanley Roper, a character in the sitcoms Three's Company and its spinoff The Ropers.
 Scott Roper, a character played by Eddie Murphy in Metro (1997 film).
 Steve Roper, a character in the comic strip Steve Roper and Mike Nomad.
 Roper, a character played by John Saxon in Enter the Dragon.
 Richard Onslow Roper, a character from John le Carré's novel The Night Manager.

See also
 Roper (disambiguation)
 Roeper (disambiguation)
 Baron Teynham, peerage held by the Roper family since 1616

English-language surnames
Occupational surnames
Norman-language surnames
English-language occupational surnames